Bob Turner (born 17 February 1942) is a former Australian rules footballer who played with Footscray in the Victorian Football League (VFL). He transferred to Williamstown in 1961 and played with the Seagulls until the end of 1966, totaling 57 games and 96 goals, playing in the losing 1961 VFA grand final against Yarraville and being awarded equal best first-year player. He won 'Town's best-and-fairest in 1964 and was selected on a half-forward flank in the Williamstown 1960's Team of the Decade.

Notes

External links 
		

1942 births
Living people
Australian rules footballers from Victoria (Australia)
Western Bulldogs players